Rakhshani may refer to:

 Rakhshani, a Baloch tribe
 Rakshani, a dialect of Balochi
 Rakhshani, Hirmand, a village in Iran

People with the name 
 Husan Bano Rakhshani, Pakistani politician
 Rhett Rakhshani, American ice hockey player